This list of Khitanologists includes those scholars who have made notable contributions to the study of the Khitan people, their culture, religion, history, language and writing systems (Khitan large script and Khitan small script).

See also
 List of sinologists
 List of Tangutologists

References

External links 

Khitanologists
Khitans